Michael Harry Holland (born 9 December 1961) is an American former ski jumper. He was world distance record holder for 27 minutes, surpassed shortly after by Matti Nykänen in 1985.

Biography
A native of Norwich, Vermont, Holland was a five time U.S. national champion. Holland competed in the 1984 Winter Olympics in Sarajevo and the 1988 Winter Olympics in Calgary, Alberta, Canada. 

On 15 March 1985, he set the ski jumping distance world record at 186 metres (610 ft) on Velikanka bratov Gorišek in Planica, Slovenia. And became only the second man to jump over 600 feet barrier. This world record was held for only 27 minutes before Finnish jumper Matti Nykänen passed his mark with a jump one meter longer. 

Holland had five top ten world cup results including a 1st-place finish in Bischofshofen, Austria in 1989; three 2nd-place finishes in Harrachov, Thunder Bay and Planica; and 3rd place in Lahti.

World Cup

Standings

Wins

Ski jumping world record

Family life
His younger brothers Joe Holland and Jim Holland were also U.S. national champions, Joe competed in the nordic combined and Jim competed in ski jumping. Both competed on the world cup circuit and in the Olympic Winter Games.

References

External links
 

1961 births
Living people
American male ski jumpers
Olympic ski jumpers of the United States
Ski jumpers at the 1984 Winter Olympics
Ski jumpers at the 1988 Winter Olympics
People from Norwich, Vermont
Sportspeople from Vermont
University of Vermont alumni